GW170814 was a gravitational wave signal from two merging black holes, detected by the LIGO and Virgo observatories on 14 August 2017. On 27 September 2017, the LIGO and Virgo collaborations announced the observation of the signal, the fourth confirmed event after GW150914, GW151226 and GW170104. It was the first binary black hole merger detected by LIGO and Virgo together.

Event detection

The signal was detected at 10:30:43 UTC. The Livingston detector was the first to receive the signal, followed by the Hanford detector 8 milliseconds later and Virgo received the signal 14 milliseconds after Livingston. The detection in all three detectors lead to a very accurate estimate of the position of the source, with a 90% credible region of just 60 deg2, a factor 20 times more accurate than before.

Astrophysical origin

The resulting black hole had a mass of  solar masses,  solar masses having been radiated away as gravitational energy.

Implications for general relativity
General relativity predicts that gravitational waves have a tensor-like (spin-2) polarization. The detection in all three detectors led to strong experimental evidence for pure tensor polarization over pure scalar or pure vector polarizations.

See also
Gravitational-wave astronomy
List of gravitational wave observations

References

External links
 GW170814 – FactSheet – LIGO
 

Binary stars
Gravitational waves
August 2017 events
Stellar black holes
2017 in science
2017 in space